Samuel W. Fitzhugh was an American politician. He was a state legislator representing Wilkinson County, Mississippi in the Mississippi House of Representatives from 1874 to 1876.

The Vicksburg Daily Times referred to him as the "cider colored negro" and a "colleague of the tallow-faced Gubbs" in a blurb deriding African American Republicans. He was one of the legislator signatories of a letter explaining their opposition to a convict labor bill.

See also
 African-American officeholders during and following the Reconstruction era

References

Year of birth missing
African-American men in politics
People from Wilkinson County, Mississippi
African-American state legislators in Mississippi
Republican Party members of the Mississippi House of Representatives
African-American politicians during the Reconstruction Era